Gabriella Christine Marte Morrison (born 27 January 2003), also known as Gabby Marte, is an American-born Dominican footballer who plays as a left back for Caravel High School, Penn Fusion Soccer Academy and the Dominican Republic women's national team.

International career
Marte has appeared for the Dominican Republic at the 2020 CONCACAF Women's Olympic Qualifying Championship qualification.

Personal life
Marte was born in the United States to a Dominican father and an American mother.

References

External links

2003 births
Living people
Citizens of the Dominican Republic through descent
Dominican Republic women's footballers
Women's association football fullbacks
Women's association football midfielders
Dominican Republic women's international footballers
Dominican Republic people of European American descent
People from Middletown, Delaware
Soccer players from Delaware
American women's soccer players
American sportspeople of Dominican Republic descent